The 1971 Scotland versus England rugby union match, also known as the Rugby Union Centenary International, was an international rugby union match played between Scotland and England on 27 March 1971, the centenary of the match between the two teams played in 1871.

Overview and background
 
The match between Scotland and England on 27 March 1971 was played one week after their Five Nations meeting. The record of both teams at the Five Nations tournament was poor: Scotland finishing last, England second-last. The two teams were separated by just one-point, both on the final standings and in their Five Nations fixture. The Scots came back to win the encounter 15–16, breaking their six-year, two-match losing streak at Twickenham Stadium. 

With the previous weeks result, the competition between both teams was considered very tight. Despite both teams' poor records in the Five Nations, it was notably mentioned as unworthy by the news-media. 

Scotland ran away with a dominant victory at home, 26–6. The twenty-point win was Scotland's biggest victory over England, and remained so for  until they met in the 1986 Five Nations.

Match details

References

 

Six Nations Championship seasons
Five Nations
1970s in Edinburgh
1971 in rugby union
England national rugby union team matches
England
History of rugby union
1971 in Scottish sport
1971 in English sport 
March 1971 sports events in the United Kingdom
History of rugby union matches between England and Scotland
1970–71 in English rugby union
1970–71 in Scottish rugby union